Bradley John Ness, OAM (born 24 November 1974) is an Australian wheelchair basketballer. He won a gold medal at the 2008 Beijing and silver medals at 2004 Athens and 2012 London Paralympics. He was selected as the Australian flag bearer at the Opening Ceremony at the 2016 Rio Paralympics.

Personal

Brad Ness was born on 24 November 1974, and is from the Western Australian country town of Wagin. On 19 December 1992, at the age of 18, he lost his leg in a boating accident aboard a high-speed ferry between Rottnest Island and Fremantle. The accident happened while the workers were preparing to leave the pier. Ness's leg was attached to the quayside when the ferry was moving out, the rope tightened and sliced off his right ankle. He was working on the ferry as a deckhand at the time. He was back to working on boats again within six months of his accident, and received his licensed mariner's licence. As a youth he competed in several sports including Australian rules football, tennis and swimming, and was good enough at football that he considered a professional career in the sport. Ness decided to try basketball after seeing a wheelchair basketball game on television.

He is married and lives in Fremantle.

In February 2013, thieves broke into his house and stole his Paralympic medals by blasting his safe out of its wall. During a ceremony at the Perth parliament house on 9 July 2013, he was given replacement medals by the Australian Paralympic Committee, a first for the organisation.

Basketball

Ness is classified as a 4.5 player and plays centre. He first started playing wheelchair basketball in 1996 after having seen the game played on television. His ability to play wheelchair basketball has been supported by the Western Australian Institute of Sport Individual Athlete Support Program, and he currently plays basketball full-time as a professional.

National team
Ness first made the national team in 1999 at the Roosevelt Cup in Georgia, USA.

Paralympics
As a member of the Australia men's national wheelchair basketball team, Ness competed at the 2000 Sydney, 2004 Athens, 2008 Beijing, and 2012 London Paralympic Games, winning a gold medal in 2008 and silver medals in 2004 and 2012. He captained the team at the 2008 and 2012 Paralympics. In 2016, he was selected for his fifth games, the 2016 Summer Paralympics in Rio de Janeiro where his team, The Rollers, finished sixth.

Other national team competitions

In 2001, Ness competed at the AOZ World Cup, where his team came in first, and he was named as part of the All-Star Five. He was part of Australia's 2003 Kitakyushu Champions Cup championship team, as well as the 2004 Asia Oceania Cup champion team. In 2004, he was a member of the national team that came in first place at the Roosevelt Cup.  He was also part of the AOZ Paralympic qualifying tournament team that finished first. He was named a member of the AOZ All-Star Five at the tournament. In 2005, he was part of the squad that competed at the Paralympic World Cup that won a silver medal. In 2006, he was named the captain of the Australian team, and was part of the Paralympic World Cup team that won a silver medal.  That year, he was also part of the squad that won a bronze medal at the World Championships. In 2008, he was part of the team that took gold at the Beijing Paralympics. He was on the team that competed in the Rollers World Challenge held in August 2009, where he scored 17 points in the match against Japan. He was part of the team that competed at IBWF AOZ Oceania Championship 2009 and won gold. At the Oceania championships, he scored 9 points and had 10 rebounds in the final match against Japan. He was past of the Australian team at the 2010 IWBF World Championships held in Birmingham, England, that won a gold medal, the team that competed at the Wheelchair Tri Series 2011, and the gold medal-winning Australia men's national wheelchair basketball team that competed at the 2010 Wheelchair Basketball World Championship. Ness was a member of the Rollers team that won the gold medal at the 2014 Wheelchair Basketball World Championship.

Club basketball
In 2000, Ness played for the Dandenong Rangers, and helped the team win the National Wheelchair Basketball League (NWBL) Championships. In 2001, he was named as part of the NWBL's All-Star Five. In 2002, he played for the Perth Wheelcats and helped that team win the NWBL Championships. In 2006, he was named the NWBL Most Valuable Player. That year, he was also playing club basketball in Italy. He was part of the 2007 Perth Wheelcats that won the NWBL Championship and the World Club Championship., he plays his club basketball in Italy for a Series A team, and the Perth Wheelcats. His Perth Wheelcats lost to the Wollongong Roller Hawks in the 2011 NWBL Championship.

University basketball
He played university basketball at the University of Texas at Arlington, where he competed as a scholarship holder.

Outreach
He is involved with helping young disabled children play basketball, and helped set up two teams for them in Cantu and Rome.

Coaching
In February 2017, Ness was appointed assistant coach for the Rollers.

Recognition
In 2022, He won the Western Australian Wheelchair Sports Star-of-the-year award with Justin Eveson in 2003. In 2007, he was awarded the Sandy Blythe Medal for International Wheelchair Basketball Player of the Year. In 2009, he received the Medal of the Order of Australia "For service to sport as a gold medallist at the Beijing 2008 Paralympic Games". In 2015, he was awarded the Western Australian Institute of Sport Personal Excellence Award. He was selected as the Australian flag bearer at the Rio Paralympics Opening Ceremony. In 2022, he was awarded Western Australian Institute of Sport Coach of the Year.

References

External links
 
 
 Brad Ness at Basketball Australia
 
 

People educated at Aquinas College, Perth
Australian men's wheelchair basketball players
Paralympic wheelchair basketball players of Australia
Wheelchair basketball players at the 2000 Summer Paralympics
Wheelchair basketball players at the 2004 Summer Paralympics
Wheelchair basketball players at the 2008 Summer Paralympics
Wheelchair basketball players at the 2012 Summer Paralympics
Medalists at the 2004 Summer Paralympics
Medalists at the 2008 Summer Paralympics
Medalists at the 2012 Summer Paralympics
Paralympic gold medalists for Australia
Paralympic silver medalists for Australia
Amputee category Paralympic competitors
Australian amputees
Western Australian Institute of Sport alumni
Recipients of the Medal of the Order of Australia
1974 births
Living people
Wheelchair basketball players at the 2016 Summer Paralympics
Paralympic medalists in wheelchair basketball
UT Arlington Mavericks men's wheelchair basketball players